Kalyani Mahavidyalaya, popularly known as Kalyani College established in 1999, is a government aided general degree college at Kalyani in Nadia district, West Bengal, India. The college offers undergraduate degree courses in arts, science and commerce.

History 
The college was established and started its journey on 18th of July, 1999. The Institution was initially eligible to run only four Hons. courses and 2 pass courses, but from the year of 2000-2001 the University of Kalyani allowed the college to run 18 courses. Dr. Amiya Kumar Mudi was the first principal of this college.

Departments

Science
Botany
Mathematics
Statistics
Computer Science
Molecular Biology and Biotechnology
Microbiology
Physiology
Physics
Chemistry

Arts and Commerce

Bengali
English
Education
Economics
History
Geography
Political Science
Sociology
Commerce

Accreditation
Kalyani Mahavidyalaya is affiliated to University of Kalyani and is also recognised by the University Grants Commission (UGC). In 2018, the college was given B grade (Institutional CGPA:-2.08) by the National Assessment and Accreditation Council(NAAC).

See also
List of institutions of higher education in West Bengal
Education in India
Education in West Bengal

References

External links
Kalyani Mahavidyalaya
University of Kalyani
University Grants Commission
National Assessment and Accreditation Council

Colleges affiliated to University of Kalyani
Educational institutions established in 1999
Universities and colleges in Nadia district
Kalyani, West Bengal
1999 establishments in West Bengal